The Florida State University Law Review is the flagship law review at the Florida State University College of Law. It publishes four issues per year and is generally recognized among the top 100 student-edited law reviews in the United States.

Overview
The Florida State University Law Review publishes four issues per year, with each issue containing a collection of articles, essays, and student-written notes. The pieces are authored by academics, judges, clerks, attorneys, and current students of the College of Law. The journal has published articles by Supreme Court justices John Paul Stevens (Volume 13) and William Rehnquist (Volume 14). Additionally, the journal has published articles by prominent academics, including Marvin Chirelstein, Melvin A. Eisenberg, Donald J. Weidner, Richard Posner, Eric Posner, and Mark Seidenfeld. The journal is staffed and edited by second- and third-year students of the Florida State University College of Law.

References

External links
 

American law journals
General law journals
Florida State University
1970 establishments in Florida